Extra Foods (also branded as extrafoods) is a supermarket chain, part of Loblaw Companies Limited. There are 10 stores in Canada, mostly in Western Canada. Most Extra Foods stores are smaller than its sister chain, Real Canadian Superstore, and most locations are in smaller, rural communities. Extra Foods is similar to Ontario's Your Independent Grocer/Zehrs banners, as well as Quebec's Provigo banner.

In 2008, Loblaw began converting some locations to the similar No Frills format already used for the company's deep-discount stores in Ontario.

In 2010, Loblaw began converting some locations to a new format similar to the "Great Foods" stores found in Ontario, some of which have since converted to Your Independent Grocer. In 2017, the chain's last Regina location was replaced by a new Real Canadian Superstore on the same property.

Store locations
As of April 24, 2022.
Grand Forks, British Columbia
Quesnel, British Columbia
Cardston, Alberta
Drumheller, Alberta
Rocky Mountain House, Alberta
St. Paul, Alberta
Meadow Lake, Saskatchewan
Swan River, Manitoba
Dryden, Ontario

See also
Real Canadian Wholesale Club
List of supermarket chains in Canada

References

External links
 

Companies based in Brampton
Loblaw Companies
Supermarkets of Canada
Cuisine of Western Canada